Psammechinus is a genus of sea urchins in the family Parechinidae containing two species:

References

Parechinidae